Decompression has several meanings, some of which are covered by several articles:
 Data decompression, the action of reversing data compression
 Decompression (physics), the release of pressure and the opposition of physical compression
 Decompression (altitude). the reduction of pressure and the related physiological effects due to increase in altitude or other equivalent reduction of ambient pressure below normal atmospheric pressure 
 Uncontrolled decompression, catastrophic reduction of pressure in accidents involving pressure vessels such as aircraft
 Decompression (diving), the reduction in pressure and the process of allowing dissolved inert gases to be eliminated from the tissues during ascent from a dive
 Decompression (comics), in comic book storytelling, is the stylistic choice to tell a story mainly by visuals, with few words.
 Decompression (surgery), a procedure used to reduce pressure on a compressed structure, such as spinal decompression
 Herniated disc decompression, a form of treatment for Spinal disc herniation, employed by chiropractors
 "Decompression" (The Outer Limits), an episode of the American television fiction series The Outer Limits